Araqi (also Romanized as ‘Arāqī; also known as ‘Arāq) is a village in Ruin Rural District, in the Central District of Esfarayen County, North Khorasan Province, Iran. At the 2006 census, its population was 507, in 109 families.

References 

Populated places in Esfarayen County